Poland competed at the 1991 World Championships in Athletics in Tokyo, Japan, from 23 August – 1 September 1991.

Medalists

References

Sources 

Nations at the 1991 World Championships in Athletics
World Championships in Athletics
Poland at the World Championships in Athletics